Gromoboi (meaning: "Thunderer") was an armoured cruiser built for the Imperial Russian Navy in the late 1890s. She was designed as a long-range commerce raider and served as such during the Russo-Japanese War of 1904–05. When the war broke out, she was based in Vladivostok and made several sorties in search of Japanese shipping in the conflict's early months without much success.

Gromoboi, with the other armoured cruisers of the Vladivostok Cruiser Squadron, attempted to rendezvous in the Strait of Tsushima with the main portion of the Russian Pacific Fleet sailing from Port Arthur in August 1904. The Fleet was delayed, and the squadron returned to port alone. On the return, the squadron encountered a Japanese squadron of four armoured cruisers blocking their passage to base. The Japanese sank the oldest Russian ship, and damaged Gromoboi and  during the subsequent Battle off Ulsan. Both Russian ships were repaired within two months. Gromoboi ran aground immediately after completing her repairs and was out of action for four months. Three months after the damage from the grounding incident was repaired, she struck a mine, but successfully returned to port. Her armament was reinforced while under repair, but she saw no further action during the war.

Gromoboi was transferred to the Russian Baltic Fleet after the end of the war and began a lengthy refit that was completed in 1911. She was mostly inactive during World War I, but had her armament and protection upgraded during the war. She was placed into reserve in 1918 and sold to a German company in 1922 for scrapping. She was forced aground near Liepāja during a storm en route to Germany and was scrapped in place.

Design and description
The use of Rossias hull design meant that the ships looked alike.

The ship displaced , only  more than designed. She was sheathed in wood and copper to reduce biofouling. As completed Gromoboi trimmed badly by the bow, which reduced her speed and made her very wet forward. Loads had to be shifted aft and ballast added to the rear of the ship to correct her trim, but she was regarded as a good sea boat afterward with an easy, although rapid, roll.

Propulsion
Gromoboi dispensed with Rossias cruising engine on the centre shaft. Thirty-two Belleville water-tube boilers provided steam for the engines.

Armament
Gromobois main armament consisted of four  45-calibre Pattern 1892 guns; the forward pair was mounted in casemates above the forward main-deck  gun's casemate. The two rear guns were situated in sponsons abreast the mizzenmast, protected by gun shields. The guns could be depressed to −5° and elevated to 18°.

Her secondary armament consisted of sixteen /45 Pattern 1892 guns. One gun was mounted under the forecastle and another in the stern; neither gun could fire to the side. Most of the remaining guns were mounted in casemates, the forward pair in front of the eight-inch guns on the upper deck and the rest on the main deck. One pair was mounted on the upper deck protected by gun shields. In their pivot mounts the guns could depress to -6° and elevate to +20°.
 
Defence against torpedo boats was provided by a variety of light-calibre weapons. Gromoboi had 24  Canet Pattern 1892 50-caliber guns mounted in sponsons on the upper deck, protected by gun shields. The rate of fire was between twelve and fifteen rounds per minute.

The ship carried twelve  Hotchkiss guns. The ship also carried 18  Hotchkiss guns.

Gromoboi also had four submerged  torpedo tubes, with two mounted on each broadside.

Armour
The Naval Ministry had hoped to increase the Gromobois armour thickness and increase the armour protection of the armament, but still use Rossia hull design. The Ministry also hoped to use the new, more resistant Krupp armour, but Russian plants had proven unable to manufacture it when it was ordered and Harvey armour was used instead. The belt was closed off by six-inch bulkheads fore and aft.

The two-inch thick transverse bulkhead fore and aft protected them from raking fire. The change in the machinery allowed Gromoboi to dispense with Rossias glacis armour that had been necessary to protect the tops of the engine cylinders. The funnel uptakes and ammunition hoists were protected by 1.5 inches of armour between the lower and middle decks.

Service
Gromoboi was built by the Baltic Works in Saint Petersburg. Construction began on 14 June 1897, although she was not formally laid down until 7 May 1898, and the ship was launched on 8 May 1899. She was transferred to Kronstadt on 24 November 1899 to finish fitting out, but was forced aground by sea ice. She was freed three days later, but needed repairs to her sheathing. She left Liepāja on 10 December 1900 en route to the Far East and stopped briefly at Kiel, where she was inspected by Prince Henry of Prussia, and at Plymouth where the officers visited the Devonport naval base. She represented Russia at the granting of the constitution to Australia, visiting Sydney and Melbourne in April–May 1901, before visiting Nagasaki in July. Gromoboi finally reached Port Arthur on 29 July 1901. She remained in the Pacific until the beginning of the Russo-Japanese War in 1904. During this voyage she was commanded by Karl Petrovich Jessen.

Russo-Japanese War

By this time, Gromoboi was assigned of the Vladivostok Cruiser Squadron under the command of Rear Admiral Karl Jessen. The squadron made a number of sorties against Japanese shipping early in the war. Only one was reasonably successful: on June 15, 1904 the squadron sank Hitachi Maru, which was carrying eighteen  siege howitzers and over 1000 troops intended for the siege of Port Arthur.

Battle off Ulsan

During the war the bulk of the Russian Pacific Fleet was located in Port Arthur where it was blockaded by the Japanese. On 10 August, the ships at Port Arthur attempted breakout to Vladivostok, but were turned back in the Battle of the Yellow Sea. Admiral Jessen was ordered to rendezvous with them, but the order was delayed. His ships had to raise steam, so he did not sortie until the evening of 13 August. Bogatyr had been damaged earlier when she grounded and did not sail with the squadron. By dawn he had reached the island of Tsushima in the Tsushima Strait between Korea and Japan. He turned back for Vladivostok when he failed to see any ships from the Port Arthur squadron.  north of the island he encountered the Japanese squadron commanded by Vice Admiral Kamimura Hikonojō tasked to patrol the Tsushima Strait. The two squadrons had passed during the night without spotting one another and each had reversed course around first light. This put the Japanese ships astride the Russian route to Vladivostok.

Jessen turned to the northeast when he spotted the Japanese at 05:00 and they followed suit, albeit on a slightly converging course. The Japanese ships concentrated their fire on Rurik, the rear ship of the Russian formation. She was hit fairly quickly and began to fall astern of the other two ships. Jessen turned southeast in an attempt to open the range, but this blinded the Russian gunners with the rising sun and prevented any of their broadside guns from bearing on the Japanese. About 06:00, Jessen turned 180° to starboard in an attempt to reach the Korean coast and to allow Rurik to rejoin the squadron. Kamimura followed suit around 06:10, but turned to port, which opened the range between the squadrons. Azuma then developed engine problems and the Japanese squadron slowed to conform with her best speed. Firing recommenced at 06:24 and Rurik was hit three times in the stern, flooding her steering compartment; she had to be steered with her engines. Her speed continued to decrease, further exposing her to Japanese fire, and her steering jammed to port around 06:40.

Jessen made another 180° turn in an attempt to interpose his two ships between the Japanese and Rurik, but the latter ship suddenly turn to starboard and increased speed and passed between Jessen's ships and the Japanese. Kamimura turned 180° as well so that both squadrons were heading southeast on parallel courses, but Jessen quickly made another 180° turn so that they headed on opposing courses. Iwate was hit around this time, which knocked out three 6-inch and one 12-pounder guns, killing 32 and wounding 43. The Japanese squadron opened the range again when it made a 180° another turn to port. The Russians reversed course for the third time around 07:45 in another attempt to support Rurik although Rossia was on fire herself; her fires were extinguished about twenty minutes later. Kamimura circled Rurik to the south at 08:00 and allowed the other two Russian ships to get to his north and gave them an uncontested route to Vladivostok.

Their arrival allowed Kamimura to pursue Jessen with all of his armoured cruisers while the two new arrivals dealt with Rurik. Azumas engines again broke down during this chase and she was replaced in the line by Tokiwa.

About 10:00, Kamimura's gunnery officer erroneously informed him that Izumo had expended three-quarters of her ammunition and he turned back after a five-minute rapid-fire barrage. He did not wish to leave the Tsushima Strait unguarded and thought that he could use his remaining ammunition on Rurik. They had radioed Kamimura that she was sunk, but he did not receive the message. Shortly after the Japanese turned back, Gromoboi and Rossia were forced to heave-to to make repairs.

Gromoboi suffered 87 dead and 170 wounded; far more than Rossias 44 dead and 156 wounded. This was attributable to Rossias captain's policy of ordering the gun crews for his quick-firing guns on the engaged side to lie down and those on the unengaged side to go below, in contrast to the Gromoboi keeping her light guns manned at all times. Gromoboi was hit fifteen times on the starboard side of her hull and seven times on her port side, plus other hits in her funnels, boats and decks. She also suffered a fire caused by the ignition of excess propellant charges. Despite this number of hits, she was not badly damaged because her waterline belt was not penetrated. She was repaired within two months by the rudimentary facilities available at Vladivostok.

Immediately following her repairs she ran aground outside Vladivostok on 13 October and was not ready for sea until February 1905. The Russians took this opportunity to reinforce her armament with six more 6-inch guns mounted on her upper deck, protected by lightly armoured casemates. Her armament was rearranged as well with her foremost six-inch guns moved from their casemates to the forecastle and the rearmost six-inch guns moved forward. Room for these changes was made by removing many of her lighter guns; she retained only nineteen 75 mm and two 37 mm guns. She also received several Barr and Stroud rangefinders at this time. While testing her new Telefunken radio equipment on 24 May she struck a mine near her forward boiler room. She was able to return to Vladivostok for repairs, but took no further part in the war.

Interwar period

Gromoboi returned to the Baltic Fleet after the war. There she was given a lengthy refit that was finished in 1911. Her engines and boilers were reconditioned, and her rear torpedo tubes were removed. The forward 15-inch torpedo tubes were replaced by  tubes. Her foremast was removed and replaced by her mizzenmast; her mainmast was moved aft in place of the mizzenmast and searchlights were installed on a platform on each mast. A casemate with 3-inch sides and a 1-inch roof was built around the rear eight-inch guns and the rear six-inch guns were moved aft and protected by a casemate with two-inch sides and a  roof. The thickness of the upper-deck casemates was increased to two inches. Armoured towers fore and aft were built for her rangefinders. Her light armament was reduced to four 75 mm and four 47 mm guns. Engine trials were conducted in late 1910 and were unsatisfactory as they were overheating while delivering only . The trials were run again on 27 July 1911 and were more satisfactory as they developed  while Gromoboi reached .

World War I

Gromoboi served in the 2nd Cruiser Brigade of the Baltic Fleet during World War I. She was modified to serve as a fast minelayer with a capacity of two hundred mines.

She engaged the German battlecruiser  at the entrance to the Gulf of Finland on August 10, 1915.

Her armament was changed in 1916–1917 as well; she exchanged the six-inch guns on the bow and stern for eight-inch guns. These additions increased her broadside to four eight-inch and eleven six-inch guns. All of her remaining light guns were removed and she received two 2.5-inch and two 47 mm anti-aircraft guns.

Gromoboi came under control of the Soviet Red Fleet in September 1917. The Treaty of Brest-Litovsk required the Soviets to evacuate their base at Helsinki in March 1918 or have them interned by newly independent Finland even though the Gulf of Finland was still frozen over. Gromoboi sailed to Kronstadt in what became known as the 'Ice Voyage' and was placed into reserve shortly after her arrival.

Post-World War I
In late October 1920, Gromobois crew mutinied and took control of the ship off Kronstadt. They killed Gromobois commisars and officers and scuttled the ship. Gromoboi was refloated and was sold to a German company for scrapping on 1 July 1922; she ran aground in a storm near Liepāja while under tow to Germany on 30 October and was scrapped in place.

Notes

Footnotes

References

External links

Site with photographs
Specifications page 

Russo-Japanese War cruisers of Russia
World War I cruisers of Russia
Naval ships of Russia
1899 ships
Cruisers of the Imperial Russian Navy
Maritime incidents in 1899
Maritime incidents in 1904
Maritime incidents in 1920
Maritime incidents in 1922
Ships built at the Baltic Shipyard